O-Six (2006–2012), also known as 832F or "The 06 Female", was a female gray wolf, whose death by hunting just outside the protected area of Yellowstone National Park stirred debate about the hunting and protection of wolves in Wyoming, Montana and Idaho. The bestselling book American Wolf focused on O-Six's life and on conservation policies in the Yellowstone region.

O-Six
O-Six is an alpha female named after the year of her birth.She has light gray fur and is recognized by the faint black ovals around her eyes. She is a kind and loving mother and she is a very intelligent fighter, admired by many wolf watchers, but as she raises her pups and defends her pack, she is in danger from hunters, cattle ranchers, and other wolves who are willing to fight for control of Lamar Valley.

Life
O-Six was for several years [2010 - 2012] the dominant breeding female of the Lamar Canyon pack in Yellowstone National Park. Born in 2006 in the Agate Creek pack to Agate Creek Wolves #113M (born a Chief Joseph Wolf in 1997) and Wolf #472F (born a Druid Peak wolf in 2000), she was principally known by the year of her birth. She was a member of the fourth generation of wolves born in Yellowstone after the 1995 reintroduction of wolves to the park. Leaving her birth pack to claim new territory, she established the Lamar Canyon pack as a three-year-old in 2010. The pack's territory in the easily accessible Lamar River Valley (named after Lucius Quintus Cincinnatus Lamar (II)) allowed tourists and wolf researchers to observe and extensively document the activities and behaviours of the wolves. As the dominant breeding female ("alpha female"), O-Six was one of the most visible and photographed wolves in Yellowstone and was described as a "rock star."

After several years, O-Six was captured, fitted with a radio-tracking collar and released, gaining the collar number 832F. She produced three litters of pups with her mate, Wolf #755M, before the Lamar Canyon pack was displaced by another wolf pack. Wandering into new territory, the remaining pack members, including O-Six, left the park, where no hunting is allowed, and appeared on private land to the east, near Crandall, Wyoming, during Wyoming's 2012 wolf hunting season. The allowed take in that season was eight wolves. She was shot by a hunter on December 6, 2012, the eighth wolf to be legally killed in Wyoming in 2012.

Legacy
The death of O-Six was immediately reported in the New York Times, leading to extensive coverage of O-Six and wolf-hunting policies surrounding Yellowstone. Following the publication of the bestselling book American Wolf by Nate Blakeslee in 2017, which focused on O-Six's life, O-Six received additional media coverage, and was the subject of a National Geographic documentary. More coverage followed the shooting of O-Six's daughter 926F in Montana in 2018.

See also
 302M - Another Yellowstone Wolf.
 History of wolves in Yellowstone
 List of wolves

References

2006 animal births
2012 animal deaths
Individual wolves
Individual animals in the United States
Wolves in the United States